Maryland's apportionment was unchanged. It elected its members October 12, 1812.

See also 
 United States House of Representatives elections, 1812 and 1813
 List of United States representatives from Maryland

Notes 

1812
Maryland
United States House of Representatives